Pont-Péan (Gallo: Pont-Riaunt) is a commune in the Ille-et-Vilaine department of Brittany in northwestern France.

Population
Inhabitants of Pont-Péan are called pont-péannais in French.

See also
Communes of the Ille-et-Vilaine department

References

External links

Official website Pont-Péan 
Pont-Péan over time (an old mining city in Brittany) 

Mayors of Ille-et-Vilaine Association 

Communes of Ille-et-Vilaine